Maxime Foerste (born in May 1991) is a German actress. She has been in several movies including Mostly Martha (2001).

Filmography
Foerste has been in films including:
 Der Mörder meiner Mutter (TV, 1999) Anne
 Bella Martha (2001)
 Endlich Urlaub! (TV, 2005) Julia
 Ein Fall für zwei (TV episode "Der Tod und das Mädchen", 2006)
 Glück auf vier Rädern (TV, 2006) Alessa Köster
 Max Minsky und ich (2006)
 Die Liebe kommt selten allein (TV, 2006) Alessa Köster
 Spieltrieb (2012)

References

External links
 
 C.V. and full filmography at her agency

1991 births
Living people
German film actresses